Mo Bus is a public transport bus service run in Bhubaneswar, Odisha. The Capital Region Urban Transport (CRUT), a special purpose vehicle (SPV), formed under Housing and Urban Development Department of the Government of Odisha operates a fleet of 310 buses to and from the capital. The buses currently operate in two phases, another phase would be established, covering all major destinations across the Bhubaneswar, Cuttack, Puri, Rourkela and Khordha. The service was inaugurated by the Chief Minister of Odisha, Naveen Patnaik on 6 November 2018.

Features
The buses are equipped with Wi-Fi, closed circuit television cameras, online ticketing systems and a smartphone application. Automated fare collection system is also there for commuters in the form of the Odyssey City Card.

Infrastructure

Bus Que Shelters

Back-lit display signage board with city map, seating arrangements, poly-carbonate semitransparent roof cover, dustbins, vertical signage posts including Global Positioning System (GPS) based public information system showing real time information of the plying Mo Buses are featured in the Bus Que Shelters (BQS). The public information system (PIS) is linked to the Bhubaneswar Operations Centre (BOC) of the Bhubaneswar Smart City Limited.

Depots
Currently, Mo Bus uses three bus depots for its operations.
Bhagabanpur
Patia
Pokhariput

Terminals
There are 14 existing terminals which is currently being used by Capital Region Urban Transport (CRUT) for Mo Bus operations.

All India Institute of Medical Sciences
Biju Patnaik International Airport
Dumduma
Gothapatna
Institute of Medical Sciences and Sum Hospital
Kalinga Nagar
Kalinga Vihar K9B
Khordha New Bus Stand
Lingipur
Mancheswar
Master Canteen Terminal
Nandankanan Zoological Park
Sai Mandir
Sikharchandi Vihar

OD Terminals
The Origin Destination (OD) Terminals are state-of-the-art bus terminals to be developed by Capital Region Urban Transport (CRUT) for the origins and destinations of the routes established. Currently, OD Terminals are set up in four locations i.e. Chandrasekharpur, Ghatikia, Kalinga Institute of Medical Sciences, and Nandankanan Zoological Park.

Routes (Capital Region)

Routes (Rourkela)

Awards

References

External links
Official Mo Bus Website

Metropolitan transport agencies of India
Transport in Bhubaneswar
Companies based in Bhubaneswar
Transport companies established in 2018
2018 establishments in Odisha